The sonnet is a European form of lyric poetry.

Sonnet or Sonett may also refer to:

Surname
 Joshua Sonett, a Columbia University surgeon
 Ewa Sonnet (born 1985), model

Brands
 Saab Sonett, a series of automobiles from Saab
 Sonnet (KDE), computer program
 Parker Sonnet, range of fountain pens from Parker Pen Company

Music
 Sonnet, an art song genre
Sonnet, a song for soprano by Massenet
Sonnet, an art song composition by Raymond Yiu (b.1973) Yiu
Sonnet, a song composition by Bizet
Sonnet, a composition for organ by Philip Wilby (b.1949)
 Sonnet (The Verve song), by English band The Verve

Painting
The sonnet (Lambert), a 1907 work by George Washington Lambert

See also
 Saab Sonett, a 1970s car
 Sonet (disambiguation)
 Sonata musical form